Proto-Kra–Dai (typically abbreviated as PKD) is the proposed reconstructed ancestor of the Kra–Dai languages.

Background
No full reconstruction of Proto-Kra–Dai has been published to date, although tentative reconstructions of many Proto-Kra–Dai roots have been attempted from time to time. Some Proto-Kra–Dai forms have been reconstructed by Benedict (1975) and Wu (2002). A reconstruction of Proto-Kam–Tai (i.e., a proposed grouping that contains all of Kra–Dai without Kra, Hlai and Jiamao) has also been undertaken by Liang & Zhang (1996).

Phonology
Proto-Kra–Dai has the finals *-l and *-c, which have been lost in most present-day Kra–Dai languages.

Norquest (2020) proposes the preglottalized sonorants *ʔb, *ʔd, *ʔɖ, *ʔɟ for Proto-Kra–Dai, as part of a four-way phonation distinction in Kra-Dai sonorants consisting of preaspirated, voiceless, plain, and preglottalized sonorants.

Lexicon

Ostapirat (2018)
Weera Ostapirat (2018a) reconstructs disyllabic forms for Proto-Kra–Dai, rather than sesquisyllabic or purely monosyllabic forms. Ostapirat (2018b:113) lists the following of his own Proto-Kra–Dai reconstructions.

Notes:
 : either  or 
 : unspecified consonant

Norquest (2020)
Norquest (2020) lists the following of his own Proto-Kra–Dai and other lower-level reconstructions.

See also
Austro-Tai languages
Old Chinese
Proto-Austronesian language
Proto-Hmong–Mien language
Proto-Austroasiatic language

Further reading
Sagart, Laurent. 2019. A model of the origin of Kra-Dai tones. Cahiers de Linguistique Asie Orientale, 48(1), 1-29. 
Sagart, Laurent. 2020. "Labial fortitions in Kra-Dai." In Sino-Tibetan-Austronesian.

References

Kra–Dai languages
Kra-Dai